Kilonzo's brush furred rat (Lophuromys kilonzoi) is a species of rodent in the family Muridae. It has been recorded from Tanzania.

References

Lophuromys
Mammals described in 2007